Lagardelle-sur-Lèze (literally Lagardelle on Lèze) is a commune in the Haute-Garonne department in southwestern France.

Population
The inhabitants of the commune are called Lagardellois in French.

Twinning
The village was twinned with Bassano in Teverina in Italy.

Geography
The Lèze flows northeast through the middle of the commune and crosses town.

See also
Communes of the Haute-Garonne department

References

Communes of Haute-Garonne